John Erlich (born by 1489–1516), of Cambridge, was an English politician.

He was a Member of Parliament (MP) for Cambridge in 1512.

References

15th-century births
1516 deaths
People from Cambridge
English MPs 1512–1514